Hadromychus is a genus of handsome fungus beetles in the family Endomychidae. There is one described species in Hadromychus, H. chandleri.

References

Further reading

 
 
 
 

Endomychidae
Articles created by Qbugbot
Coccinelloidea genera